The Aaron Jr. and Susan Parker Farm is a historic farm property at 1715 Brook Road in Cavendish, Vermont.  Now just , the property includes a c. 1815 Federal style farmhouse, and a well-preserved early 19th century English barn.  The farmstead was listed on the National Register of Historic Places in 2014.

Description and history
The farm's remaining  are roughly divided in half by the road, with a woodlot on the east side of the road, and a mown meadow and the farm buildings on the west side. The house, set near the road, is a -story brick building, with a side gable roof and end chimneys. The front facade is five bays wide and symmetrical, with a center entrance topped by a transom window. The first-floor bays of the front facade are all topped by blind arches. A modern single-story garage extends northward from the right side of the house, and an older wood-frame structure extends to the rear. The barn stands just northwest of the house, and is set further back from the road.

The oldest portion of the house, its rear ell, was built about 1795 by Aaron Parker Jr., the son of one of Cavendish's early settlers.  Sometime in the 1810s, he built the brick main block to which it is now attached; this is based on stylistic evidence, as the blind arches on the front are a feature typically found only in Vermont houses from that period.  Other stylistic elements of the house are clearly drawn from the published patterns of Asher Benjamin, a resident of nearby Windsor who published the nation's first architectural pattern book, the 1797 Country Builder's Assistant.  The house remained in the hands of Parker's descendants until 1933.

See also
National Register of Historic Places listings in Windsor County, Vermont

References

Historic districts on the National Register of Historic Places in Vermont
Farms on the National Register of Historic Places in Vermont
National Register of Historic Places in Windsor County, Vermont
Commercial buildings completed in 1795
Buildings and structures in Cavendish, Vermont